Ganesh could refer to one of two films:

Ganesh (1998 film)
Ganesh (2009 film)